Maternity Protection Convention, 2000 is  an International Labour Organization Convention.

It was established in 2000, with the preamble stating:
"Noting the need to revise the Maternity Protection Convention (Revised), 1952, and the Maternity Protection Recommendation, 1952, in order to further promote equality of all women in the workforce and the health and safety of the mother and child, and in order to recognize the diversity in economic and social development of Members, as well as the diversity of enterprises, and the development of the protection of maternity in national law and practice, and

"Noting the provisions of the Universal Declaration of Human Rights (1948), the United Nations Convention on the Elimination of All Forms of Discrimination Against Women (1979), the United Nations Convention on the Rights of the Child (1989), the Beijing Declaration and Platform for Action (1995), the International Labour Organization's Declaration on Equality of Opportunity and Treatment for Women Workers (1975), the International Labour Organization's Declaration on Fundamental Principles and Rights at Work and its Follow-up (1998), as well as the international labour Conventions and Recommendations aimed at ensuring equality of opportunity and treatment for men and women workers, in particular the Convention concerning Workers with Family Responsibilities, 1981, and

"Taking into account the circumstances of women workers and the need to provide protection for pregnancy, which are the shared responsibility of government and society, and

"Having decided upon the adoption of certain proposals with regard to the revision of the Maternity Protection Convention (Revised), 1952, and Recommendation, 1952, which is the fourth item on the agenda of the session, and

"Having determined that these proposals shall take the form of an international Convention;

"adopts this fifteenth day of June of the year two thousand the following Convention, which may be cited as the Maternity Protection Convention, 2000."

History 

This Convention revised a 1952 ILO convention (C103), which in turn was a revision of the original 1919 ILO convention (C3). The revision was aimed at gaining more ratification by easing the requirements of the 1952 convention.

Content 

The convention addresses the following subjects:
Health protection
Maternity leave (more than 14 week)
Leave in case of illness or complications
Benefits
Employment protection and non-discrimination
Breastfeeding mothers

Ratifications

As of the October 2022, the following 40 states have ratified this Convention:

References

External links 
Text.
Ratifications and leave length declarations.

Maternity
Motherhood
Women's rights instruments
Treaties concluded in 2000
Treaties entered into force in 2002
Treaties of Albania
Treaties of Austria
Treaties of Azerbaijan
Treaties of Belarus
Treaties of Belize
Treaties of Benin
Treaties of Bosnia and Herzegovina
Treaties of Bulgaria
Treaties of Burkina Faso
Treaties of Cuba
Treaties of the Czech Republic
Treaties of Cyprus
Treaties of the Dominican Republic
Treaties of Hungary
Treaties of Italy
Treaties of Kazakhstan
Treaties of Latvia
Treaties of Lithuania
Treaties of Luxembourg
Treaties of North Macedonia
Treaties of Mali
Treaties of Moldova
Treaties of Montenegro
Treaties of Morocco
Treaties of the Netherlands
Treaties of Norway
Treaties of Peru
Treaties of Portugal
Treaties of Romania
Treaties of Serbia
Treaties of Slovakia
Treaties of Slovenia
Treaties of Switzerland
2000 in labor relations
2000 in women's history